Micropristis is an extinct genus of ganopristid sclerorhynchoid that lived in the Middle East and Europe during the Late Cretaceous.

References

Cretaceous cartilaginous fish
Cretaceous fish of Europe
Prehistoric cartilaginous fish genera